Suzana Milovanović (Serbian Cyrillic: Сузана Миловановић, born 12 November 1979 in Loznica, SFR Yugoslavia) is a Serbian female basketball player. She plays small forward position.

External links
Profile at fibaeurope.com
Profile at eurobasket.com

1979 births
Living people
Sportspeople from Loznica
Small forwards
Serbian women's basketball players
ŽKK Partizan players
ŽKK Vojvodina players